Mannon may refer to:

Mannon, Illinois, unincorporated community
Cliff Mannon (born 1970), American handball goalkeeper and Olympian
James Mannon (born 1942), American professor of sociology
Wilson Mannon (1928–1992), American murder victim; see Murder of Wilson Mannon
Ezra, Christine, Lavinia and Orin Mannon,  characters in Eugene O'Neil's 1931 play Mourning Becomes Electra

See also
 Manon (disambiguation)
 Mannan (disambiguation)
 Mannen, a Norwegian mountain
 Mannone